Ruggles may refer to:

Places
 Ruggles, Ohio, an unincorporated community
 Ruggles Island, in the Falkland Islands
 Ruggles River, Nunavut, Canada
 Ruggles Township, Ashland County, Ohio, USA

Other uses
 Ruggles (surname)
 Ruggles station, an MBTA train, bus and subway station
 Ruggles of Red Gap (disambiguation)
 Ruggles Mine, an open-pit pegmatite tourist mine, in Grafton, New Hampshire, United States
 Ruggles Prize, for excellence in Mathematics
 The Ruggles, an early American television sitcom (1949–52)
 The surname of the main characters in the book The Family from One End Street and its sequels